Edward Bighead is a fictional character in the cartoon series Rocko's Modern Life and the comic book series of the same name. Mr. Bighead, an anthropomorphic cane toad, lives next door to the main character of the show, Rocko, whom he vehemently dislikes. In the television show, he is voiced by Charles Adler.

Development
Joe Murray, the creator of Rocko's Modern Life, said that he based the Bigheads on a group of neighbours who lived next door to Murray during his childhood. Murray described the neighbours as "grumpy and pissed about everything." The general concept involving characters with large heads originated from a comic, written by Murray, named "Rizzo the Art Director."

Description
Ed Bighead is an employee at a large company. He is cold, petty, evil, bossy, and has a terrible temper; in fact, the only people that he fears are his wife, Bev, and his boss, Mr. Dupette. He particularly dislikes Rocko and his friends, Heffer Wolfe and Filburt. He usually yells at anyone he sees and grumbles bitterly under his breath at any situation he finds even slightly troubling. In the musical episode, Zanzibar, O-Town's citizens are cleaning up the city, where it is revealed that he cares little about the environment and even wants "the sky to be filled with garbage too", primarily toxic waste in the Ionosphere.

In the original television show, Ed works at the Conglom-O Corporation, the largest company in town. In the episode Old Foggy Froggy, it is revealed that he has worked at Conglom-O since at least 1961, yet despite his long tenure, his "slimy boss" Mr. Dupette, has never promoted him into a permanent position in the top echelons of the company. While his actual job at Conglom-O varies throughout the course of the show, he seems to be stuck in mostly middle management roles that occasionally cause him a great deal of stress (She's the Toad, Zanzibar). He has also been shown as a lowly worker (Teed Off, Magic Meatball) to being an executive of sorts (Closet Clown, Canned). In the episode Teed Off, Ed states his current job at Conglom-O is "Checking the bottle caps on all the bottles." And agrees to lose a round of golf to Mr. Dupette (in secret) in order to get a promotion to "Put" the bottle caps on the bottles, a prospect that seems very thrilling to him.

In the later seasons of the show, his character is fleshed out more.  He is shown to display, at times, genuine affection for Rocko and his friends (Old Fogey Froggy, Put to Pasture), but is mostly grouchy towards them. However, in Rocko's Modern Life: Static Cling, he was on better terms with Rocko when they helped save O-town.

In the comic book, Ed Bighead works for a similar company headed by a white elephant named Donald Frump (a parody of Donald Trump).

Relationships
Ed is the husband of Bev Bighead, and Bev is the only character in the series that can turn Ed from mean to downright terrified. They celebrated their 30th wedding anniversary in “I Have No Son”. Bev has the strength to stand up to Ed, and this makes her quite a powerful figure. Indeed, she is probably the most powerful figure for Ed, because anyone else who Ed torments never does anything to stop it. Therefore, the other characters, particularly Rocko, are always under his control. He does not have many friends and is disliked by many, but appears to not be bothered by this.

He had an estranged relationship with his son Ralph, who created a show called "The Fatheads," which was loosely based on his parents. Ralph also becomes a cartoonist instead of following Ed's footsteps at Conglom-O, which caused Ed to deny he had a son. The two of them later reconciled after Rocko and Filburt contact him about his parents’ 30th anniversary. They both reconcile at the end when they admitted they still care for each other (Ralph even kept the donut from the initiation at Conglom-O). Ralph eventually came out as transgender under the name Rachel in Rocko's Modern Life: Static Cling and although Ed wasn't accepting at first, he later accepted the transition.

References

Animated characters introduced in 1992
Fictional frogs
Fictional bullies
Fictional business executives
Male characters in animated series
Rocko's Modern Life characters
Television characters introduced in 1992